The St. Cloud State Huskies women's ice hockey program represented St. Cloud State University during the 2014-15 NCAA Division I women's ice hockey season. Despite a disappointing season, the team managed to upset nationally ranked Wisconsin on February 20, 2015, on the strength of 52 saves by goaltender Julie Friend.

Offseason
May 29: St. Cloud State University hired Eric Rud as the new Head Coach of the Huskies.

Recruiting

2014–15 Huskies

Schedule

|-
!colspan=12 style=""| Regular Season

|-
!colspan=12 style=""| WCHA Tournament

References

St. Cloud State
St. Cloud State Huskies women's ice hockey seasons
St. Cloud
2014 in sports in Minnesota
2015 in sports in Minnesota